Music for Mechanics is the first sequential collection of the American comic book series Love and Rockets by the Hernandez brothers and published in 1985.

The cover of the book is by Jaime Hernandez and the preface by Carter Scholz.

Contents
These first stories, dated 1981–1985, are science-fiction oriented, adding monsters and dinosaurs and extra-terrestrials to the first latino themes, and some stories and themes may or may not be considered canon with the universes developed by the brothers in later books.

Chronology
Next album: Chelo's Burden

American graphic novels
Fantagraphics titles
1985 comics debuts